Limnae or Limnai was a town of ancient Cappadocia, inhabited in Byzantine times. Limnae was the place of exile and death of Marcus, a Byzantine usurper.

Its site is located near Gölçük, Asiatic Turkey.

References

Populated places in ancient Cappadocia
Former populated places in Turkey
Populated places of the Byzantine Empire
History of Niğde Province